Lemvig-Thyborøn Håndbold is a handball team from Lemvig, Denmark. It plays in the Danish Handball League. Their head coach is Arne Damgaard.

Lemvig-Thyborøn Håndbold's license belongs to the parent club Lemvig Nissum Håndbold, which was founded way back in 1969, under the name NNFH Lemvig. Later, a professional elite division was created for the best men's team, first under the name Lemvig Håndbold, and later Lemvig-Thyborøn Håndbold.

Team

Staff
Staff for the 2021-22 season

Current squad
Squad for the 2022-23 season

Goalkeeper
 12  Simon Egtved
 16  Daniel Freyr Andrésson
Wingers
LW
 5  Mats Gordon Krog
 22  Jacob Hessellund
RW
 17  Anders Flæng
 23  Jesper Kokholm
Line Players
 7  Niels Lindholt
 9  Nicolai Pugholm Hvid (c)
 14  Fredrik Clementsen
 26  Mathias Porsholdt

Back players
LB
 21  Jorn Smits
 55  Amadeus Hedin
CB
 8  Jeppe Gade Nielsen
 11  Thomas Bohl Damgaard
 32  Christian Holm
RB
 6  Jon Katballe
 10  Vilhelm Poulsen

Transfers
Transfers for the season 2023-24

Joining
  Rasmus Thiemer Jensen (AC)
  Emil Tellerup (GK) (from  Fredericia HK)
  Tobias Bay (LW) (from  Skive fH)
  Emil Jensen (CB) (from  TTH Holstebro)
  Tobias Myssing (RW) (from  HØJ Elite)

Leaving
  Martin Hansen (AC)
  Daniel Freyr Andrésson (GK) (to  )
  Jacob Hessellund (LW) (retires)
  Amadeus Hedin (LB)
  Thomas Damgaard (CB) (to  TTH Holstebro)

References

External links 
 The club's homepage 

Danish handball clubs
Thyboron Handbold